The 2009 Kremlin Cup was a tennis tournament played on indoor hard courts. It was the 19th edition of the Kremlin Cup, and was part of the ATP World Tour 250 Series of the 2009 ATP World Tour, and of the Premier Series of the 2009 WTA Tour. It was held at the Olympic Stadium in Moscow, Russia, from 17 October through 25 October 2009.

ATP entrants

Seeds

 seeds are based on the rankings of October 12, 2009

Other entrants
The following players received wildcards into the singles main draw:
  Mikhail Biryukov
  Evgeny Donskoy
  Andrey Kuznetsov

The following players received entry from the qualifying draw:
  Nicolas Kiefer
  Mikhail Kukushkin
  Illya Marchenko
  Sergiy Stakhovsky

WTA entrants

Seeds

 seeds are based on the rankings of October 12, 2009

Other entrants
The following players received wildcards into the singles main draw:
  Yana Buchina
  Ksenia Pervak

The following players received entry from the qualifying draw:
  Nuria Llagostera Vives
  Tsvetana Pironkova
  Evgeniya Rodina
  Galina Voskoboeva

Finals

Men's singles

 Mikhail Youzhny defeated  Janko Tipsarević, 6–7(5–7), 6–0, 6–4
 It was Youzhny's 1st title of the year, and the 5th of his career.

Women's singles

 Francesca Schiavone defeated  Olga Govortsova, 6–3, 6–0
 It was Schiavone's 1st title of the year, and the 2nd of her career.

Men's doubles

 Pablo Cuevas /  Marcel Granollers defeated  František Čermák /  Michal Mertiňák, 4–6, 7–5, [10–8]
 It was Cuevas's 2nd title of the year and the 3rd of his career. It was Granollers's 3rd title of the year and the 3rd of his career.

Women's doubles

 Maria Kirilenko /  Nadia Petrova defeated  Maria Kondratieva /  Klára Zakopalová, 6–2, 6–2
 It was Kirilenko's 1st title of the year and the 6th of her career. It was Petrova's 3rd title of the year and the 18th of her career.

External links
 Official website

2009 Kremlin Cup
2009 ATP World Tour
2009 WTA Tour
2009 in Russian tennis
2009 in Moscow
October 2009 sports events in Russia